Argaki is a village in Cyprus, southeast of the city of Morphou. De facto, it is under the control of Northern Cyprus, considered by the international community to be part of the Republic of Cyprus.

References

External links
 
 https://www.telegraph.co.uk/news/obituaries/9252965/Peter-Loizos.html

Communities in Nicosia District
Populated places in Güzelyurt District